Sweeney may refer to:

People
Sweeney (name)
Clan Sweeney, an Irish clan of Scottish origin

Places
Sweeney Mountains, Palmer Land, Antarctica
Sweeney Ridge, a national park in California, United States

Arts and entertainment
The Madness of Sweeney, a mediaeval Irish legend
Sweeney an Australian bush ballad (1893) by Henry Lawson
Sweeney Agonistes, an abandoned "Aristophanic Melodrama" by T. S. Eliot; also two poems, "Sweeney Erect" and "Sweeney Among the Nightingales" from Eliot's Poems (1920)
The Sweeney, a British television series
Sweeney!, a spin-off film of the TV show
Sweeney 2, the 1978 sequel
The Sweeney (2012 film)
The Sweeney: Paris, an alternative name for the French film The Squad (2015 film), a remake of the 2012 film
The Sweeney, British band formed by Murray Torkildsen

Other uses
 London slang for the Flying Squad, a branch of the Metropolitan Police Service

See also
 Sweeny (disambiguation)
 Justice Sweeney (disambiguation)